Road signs in the Republic of Bulgaria were introduced by the Road Traffic Act and are regulated by:
 Regulations for the implementation of the Road Traffic Act, adopted by a Decree of the Council of Ministers;
 Ordinance No. 18 of July 23, 2001 on road signaling with traffic signs, issued by the Minister of Regional Development and Public Works.

Both normative documents are harmonized with the Vienna Convention on Road Signs and Signals (1968), which was ratified by Bulgaria on December 28, 1978. (This Convention was not published in the State Gazette). Road signs in Bulgaria use the SNV typeface as well as in neighboring Romania and the countries of the former Yugoslavia (Bosnia-Herzegovina, Croatia, Kosovo, North Macedonia, Montenegro, Serbia and Slovenia). In Switzerland, the SNV typeface was also used on road signs before being replaced with the ASTRA-Frutiger typeface in 2003.

Today there are some differences between the two documents regarding road signs. The latest changes in Ordinance No. 18 were promulgated in the State Gazette No. 13, dated February 14, 2020. These changes are not reflected in the Regulations for the Implementation of the Road Traffic Act.

Warning signs

Priority signs

Prohibitory signs

Mandatory signs

Information signs

Additional Plates

References

External links

Bulgaria
Road transport in Bulgaria